Indirect presidential elections were held in Fiji on 22 October 2021, in which members of parliament elected the president.

Wiliame Katonivere was nominated as the FijiFirst government's candidate by Prime Minister Frank Bainimarama, while Teimumu Kepa was nominated by Opposition Whip Lynda Tabuya. Katonivere was able to gain the support of a majority of MPs in the first round of voting, defeating Kepa by 28 votes to 23. An opposition MP, Mosese Bulitavu of SODELPA, also voted for Katonivere. 

Two former prime ministers weighed in on the appointment; Mahendra Chaudhry called on the nominees to be disqualified, citing Section 83 (1) (c) of the 2013 constitution, which requires that the holder of the office not be affiliated with any political party as Katonivere was the incumbent president of FijiFirst party, and Kepa was a member of SODELPA. Meanwhile Sitiveni Rabuka praised Katonivere's appointment, adding that it showed that the people still have respect for the chiefly system of Fiji.

Results

References

Presidential elections in Fiji
2021 in Fiji